Fire Island Ferries is a passenger and freight ferry service, serving the Western communities of Fire Island, New York.

History
Edward J. Mooney, who joined the company in 1948, acquired Fire Island Ferries in 1972. After Mooney's death in December 2020, his casket was taken around Great South Bay for a memorial aboard one of the company's ferry boats.

Zee Line Ferry Acquisition

South Bay Water Taxi Acquisition

Fire aboard the Fire Island Belle
On September 20, 2009, at 10:10 eastern daylight time, the passenger ferry Fire Island Belle, with 100 passengers, the vessel master, and two deckhands on board, experienced an engine room fire in the Great South Bay between Long Island and Fire Island, New York.

No passengers or crewmembers were injured, and no pollution resulted. The cost of repairing the vessel was $490,000. The U.S. Coast Guard was the lead
investigative agency in the accident. The National Transportation Safety Board (NTSB) provided assistance with fire investigation and metallurgical analysis.

Destinations

Kismet
Saltaire (village)
Fair Harbor
Dunewood
Atlantique
Ocean Beach (village)
Seaview
Ocean Bay Park

Fire Island Ferry Fleet 
As if 10.17.2019, Fire Island Ferries, Inc operates the following vessels:

Fire Island Water Taxi

References

External links
Fire Island Ferries

Fire Island Travel Guide

Fire Island, New York
Ferry companies of New York (state)